Acetylfentanyl (acetyl fentanyl) is an opioid analgesic drug that is an analog of fentanyl. Studies have estimated acetylfentanyl to be fifteen times more potent than morphine,  which would mean that despite being somewhat weaker than fentanyl, it is nevertheless still several times stronger than pure heroin. It has never been licensed for medical use and instead has only been sold as a designer drug. Acetylfentanyl was discovered at the same time as fentanyl itself and had only rarely been encountered on the illicit market in the late 1980s. However, in 2013, Canadian police seized 3 kilograms of acetylfentanyl. As a μ-opioid receptor agonist, acetylfentanyl may serve as a direct substitute for heroin or other opioids. Common side effects of fentanyl analogs are similar to those of fentanyl itself, which include itching, nausea and potentially serious respiratory depression, which can be life-threatening. Fentanyl analogs have killed hundreds of people throughout Europe and the former Soviet republics since the most recent resurgence in use began in Estonia in the early 2000s, and novel derivatives continue to appear.

Deaths

Europe
Acetylfentanyl has been analytically confirmed in 32 fatalities in four European member states between 2013 and August 2015, Germany (2), Poland (1), Sweden (27) and the United Kingdom (2).

Russia
Twelve deaths have been associated with acetylfentanyl in Russia since 2012.

United States
The Centers for Disease Control and Prevention (CDC) issued a health alert to report that between March 2013 and May 2013, 14 overdose deaths related to injected acetylfentanyl had occurred among intravenous drug users (ages between 19 and 57 years) in Rhode Island. After confirming five overdoses in one county, including a fatality, Pennsylvania asked coroners and medical examiners across the state to screen for acetylfentanyl. As a result of this investigation, Pennsylvania confirmed at least one acetylfentanyl overdose death and attributed at least 50 fatalities to either fentanyl or acetylfentanyl during the first half of 2013. In July 2015, the DEA informed about 52 confirmed fatalities involving acetylfentanyl in the United States between 2013 and 2015.

Japan

One fatal poisoning caused by intravenous injection of a "bath salt" product containing acetylfentanyl and 4'-Methoxy-α-pyrrolidinopentiophenone (aka 4-MeO-α-PVP, a substituted cathinone) has been reported in 2016.

Legal status

Canada
As an analog of fentanyl, acetylfentanyl is a Schedule I controlled drug.

China

As of October, 2015 acetylfentanyl is a controlled substance in China.

United States
Acetylfentanyl is a Schedule I controlled substance as of May 2015.

Switzerland
Acetylfentanyl is illegal in Switzerland as of December 2015.

United Kingdom
Acetylfentanyl was made a class A drug as an analogue of fentanyl in 1986.

Overdose
Acetylfentanyl overdosage has been reported to closely resemble heroin overdosage clinically. Additionally, while naloxone (Narcan) is effective in treating acetylfentanyl overdose, larger than normal doses of the antidote may be required.

Detection in body fluids
Acetylfentanyl may be quantitated in blood, plasma or urine by liquid chromatography-mass spectrometry to confirm a diagnosis of poisoning in hospitalized patients or to provide evidence in a medicolegal death investigation. Postmortem peripheral blood acetylfentanyl concentrations have been in a range of 89–945 μg/L in victims of acute overdosage.

See also 
 3-Methylbutyrfentanyl
 3-Methylfentanyl
 4-Fluorofentanyl
 α-Methylfentanyl
 Butyrfentanyl
 Furanylfentanyl
 Homofentanyl
 List of fentanyl analogues

References

Further reading 
 

General anesthetics
Synthetic opioids
Piperidines
Anilides
Acetamides
Mu-opioid receptor agonists
Janssen Pharmaceutica
Belgian inventions
Euphoriants
Fentanyl